Journey to the Alcarria is a travel book by the Spanish Nobel Prize-winning author Camilo José Cela. It was published in 1948.

Written in the third person, the book describes the author's travels in the Alcarria region of Spain. It has been described as "the most celebrated Spanish travelogue of all times". It was translated into English by Frances M. López-Morillas and published by the University of Wisconsin Press in 1964. In 1986, the author published a follow-up book called Nuevo viaje a la Alcarria.

References

1948 non-fiction books
Spanish non-fiction books
Travel books
Works by Camilo José Cela
Books about Spain
University of Wisconsin Press books